Cross Roads High School is a 2A public high school located in unincorporated Cross Roads about 8 miles south of Malakoff, Texas (USA). The school is often referred to as Malakoff Cross Roads.  It is part of the Cross Roads Independent School District located in southern Henderson County.  In 2011, the school was rated "Academically Acceptable" by the Texas Education Agency.

Athletics
The Cross Roads Bobcats compete in the following sports:

Volleyball, Football, Basketball, Golf, Track, Softball & Baseball

References

External links
Cross Roads ISD

Schools in Henderson County, Texas
Public high schools in Texas